The Cork Premier Intermediate Football Championship (known for sponsorship reasons as Bon Secours Cork County Premier Intermediate Football Championship and abbreviated to the Cork PIFC) is an annual Gaelic football competition organised by the Cork County Board of the Gaelic Athletic Association and contested by the top-ranking intermediate clubs in the county of Cork in Ireland. It is the third tier overall in the entire Cork Gaelic football championship system.

The Cork Premier Intermediate Championship was introduced in 2006 following a split in the existing Cork Intermediate Football Championship. At the time of its creation it was the second tier of Cork Gaelic football.

In its current format, the Cork Premier Intermediate Championship begins in April. The 12 participating club are drawn into three groups of four teams and play each other in a round-robin system. The three group winners and the three runners-up proceed to the knockout phase that culminates with the final match at Páirc Uí Rinn in October. The winner of the Cork Premier Intermediate Championship, as well as being presented with the Billy Long Cup, qualifies for the subsequent Munster Club Championship.

The competition has been won by 13 teams. Mallow, Newmarket, Valley Rovers and St. Vincent's are the only teams to have won the tournament on more than one occasion. Kanturk are the title holders, defeating Bantry Blues in the 2022 final.

Format

Current

Development
On 2 April 2019, a majority of 136 club delegates voted to restructure the championship once again. The new format also led to a reduction in the number of participating clubs from 16 to 12.

Overview
Group stage: The 12 teams are divided into three groups of four. Over the course of the group stage, which features one game in April and two games in August, each team plays once against the others in the group, resulting in each team being guaranteed at least three games. Two points are awarded for a win, one for a draw and zero for a loss. The teams are ranked in the group stage table by points gained, then scoring difference and then their head-to-head record. The top three teams in each group qualify for the knock-out stage.

Play-off: The second best and third best third placed teams from the group stage play off for last quarter-final place.

Quarter-finals: The play-off winner and the seven top-ranking teams from the group stage contest this round. The four winners from these four games advance to the semi-finals.

Semi-finals: The four quarter-final winners contest this round. The two winners from these four games advance to the semi-finals.

Final: The two semi-final winners contest the final. The winning team are declared champions and gain automatic promotion to the following year's Cork Senior A Championship.

2023 Teams

Sponsorship
Since 2006 the Premier Intermediate Championship has been sponsored by the Evening Echo.

Trophy
The winning team is presented with the Billy Long Cup. Billy Long was involved with the Lees club in the 1940s and 1950s. He was a selector with the Cork senior football team in 1956 and was a member of the County Board Executive.

List of finals

Notes:
 2006 - The final went to two replays after St. Vincent's and Glanmire drew 0-09 apiece and 0-12 apiece.

Roll of Honour

By Division

Records and statistics

Final

Team
Most wins: 2, joint record:
St. Vincent's (2006, 2012)
Mallow (2007, 2017)
Valley Rovers (2009, 2014)
Newmarket (2011, 2021)
Most appearances in a final: 5, St. Michael's (2012, 2015, 2017, 2018, 2019)
Most Final appearances without ever winning: 5, St. Michael's (2012, 2015, 2017, 2018, 2019)
 Longest gap between wins: 10 years, joint record:
Mallow (2007, 2017)
Newmarket (2011, 2021)

Top scorers

By season

Overall

References

 
1